Anolis dissimilis, the odd anole, is a species of lizard in the family Dactyloidae. The species is found in Peru and Brazil.

References

Anoles
Reptiles of Peru
Reptiles of Brazil
Reptiles described in 1965
Taxa named by Ernest Edward Williams